  
Bassingham is a village and civil parish in the North Kesteven district of Lincolnshire, England. The population of the civil parish at the 2011 census was 1,425.

Bassingham is situated about midway between Newark-on-Trent and Lincoln. The parish is defined by the River Witham to the west, and the River Brant to the east (across Bassingham Fen). To the south-west is Carlton-le-Moorland.

A Ham class minesweeper, HMS Bassingham, was named after the village.

The church of St. Michael and All Angels was recorded in the Domesday Book of 1086. The church is in the Bassingham Group of seven churches.

In 1998 the church added a seventh bell: the ship's bell from HMS Bassingham, presented by her former commander after she was decommissioned. It hangs in a mahogany bell hood in the north aisle and is rung to signal the start of Sunday worship.

Bassingham has two public houses, the Five Bells and the Bugle Horn, a primary school, and a Methodist chapel.

References

External links
 
 Village website
 Primary school
 Withamside United Parish
 NKDC page
 

Villages in Lincolnshire
Civil parishes in Lincolnshire
North Kesteven District